Trevor Victor Hohns (born 23 January 1954) is a former Queensland and Australian cricketer who played in seven Test matches as a spin bowler, and was later Australia's chairman of selectors.

Earlier in his career when Hohns was a relatively obscure player on the fringes of Queensland cricket, he signed up to play for the Rebel Australians during the controversial South African series in 1985–86 and 1986–87 during the Apartheid reign. Hohns was one of only two spin bowlers in the touring party, along with former Australian Test left-arm spinner, Tom Hogan. Hohns was one of the Rebel Australians banned from playing state and Test cricket for the following two years.

Hohns played all of his seven tests in 1989, making his international debut at the age of 35. He played in the final two tests of the 1988–89 series against the West Indies, and in five tests of the 1989 Ashes series in England. Although most of the bowling success in that series was due to the fast bowling trio of Terry Alderman, Geoff Lawson and Merv Hughes, Hohns took 11 wickets, and averaged 31.75 with the bat.

Hohns also was a handy late-order batsman, often batting as high as number six for Queensland in Sheffield Shield cricket. He finished his first-class career with two centuries and 30 half-centuries from 152 matches, though 40 was his best Test score among his seven innings.

Hohns has also had impact on Australian cricket as a selector. He has been a selector from 1994 to 2006, and 2014 to the present (2021); and chairman of selectors from 1996 to 2006, and 2016 to 2021. In his first term as chairman he made several tough decisions, including ending the careers of Ian Healy and Mark Waugh and stripping Steve Waugh of the one-day captaincy.

References

External links
 

1954 births
Living people
Australia Test cricketers
Australian cricket administrators
Queensland cricketers
Queensland cricket captains
Australia national cricket team selectors
Australian cricketers
Cricketers from Brisbane